The National Olympic Committee of Zambia (IOC code: ZAM) is the National Olympic Committee representing Zambia. It was created in 1951 as the National Olympic Committee of Northern Rhodesia and recognised by the IOC in 1963.

Zambia made its debut at the 1968 Summer Olympics in Mexico City. Previously, it competed as Northern Rhodesia in 1964 (changing its name on the day of the closing ceremony) and under the banner of Rhodesia in 1960.

Since 2010, the Committee, in conjunction with the International Olympic Committee (IOC) and the Government of Zambia have operated an Olympic Youth Development Center (OYDC) in Lusaka, Zambia. The center was opened as a pilot project by the IOC and is open to all youth in the country.

Presidents of Committee
present – Mr. Alfred Foloko
predecessor – Ms. Miriam Moyo

Vice Presidents of Committee
present – Ms. Hazel Kennedy

Executive Board 2017-2021
President – Mr. Alfred Foloko
Vice President – Ms. Hazel Kennedy
Secretary-General – Mr. Boniface Kambikambi
Treasurer – Mr. Victor Banda
Members – Mr. Guy Phiri, Mr. Dickson Jere, Mrs. Susanna Dakik, Ms. Suwilanji Mpondela

Secretariat Staff
 As of 2021
The National Olympic Committee of Zambia (NOCZ) Secretariat is located at OlympAfrica Centre Stand Number 27007 New Kasangula Road Lusaka.
Currently, NOC Zambia employs eight full-time employees.

Gloria Makungu – Administration Officer
Chaelelwa Kazika – Accounts Manager
Chipo Mulenga – Programmes Officer
Tinyiko Lucert Kamanga – Programmes Officer: Olympafrica Centre
Prudence Nswana – Safe Sport Officer
Felix Munyika – Communications and Marketing Officer
Francis Mwansa – Office Assistant
Jabess Zulu – Caretaker: Olympafrica Centre

eqUIP Intern Programme 

Five students/and or recent graduates have benefitted from the Internship Programme partnership between the Commonwealth Games Foundation and NOC Zambia (Commonwealth Games Association of Zambia).  

Present – Mr. Chishimba Bwalya - University of Zambia (2020-2021)
Past – Ms. Denise Cohen - Cavendish University (2019-2020)
Past – Mr. Felix Munyika - University of Zambia (2018-2019)
Past – Mr. Charles Ziwa - University of Zambia (2017-2018)
Past – Ms. Tinyiko Lucert Kamanga - Copperbelt University (2016-2017)

See also
Zambia at the Olympics
Zambia at the Commonwealth Games

References

Zambia
Zambia